The Southwest Symposium on Image Analysis and Interpretation is the IEEE biennial conference on image analysis, computer vision and pattern recognition. It is considered, together with CVPR, the major conference in interpretation of images and video in the United States. It was first held in San Antonio, TX in April, 1996. It is indexed by IEEE  and the Institute for Scientific Information (ISI). It is also included in Scopus and Scimago.

References

External links
 
 Scimago and Scopus
 IEEE website

Southwest Symposium on Image Analysis and Interpretation
Computer science conferences